Rayan Aït-Nouri (born 6 June 2001) is an Algerian professional footballer who plays as a left-back or a wing-back for Premier League club Wolverhampton Wanderers. Born in France, Aït-Nouri has committed to representing Algeria at international level.

Club career

Angers
Aït-Nouri is a graduate of the Angers youth academy, which he joined from Paris FC in July 2016 in return for covering Aït-Nouri's tuition fees of €5,000. He signed his professional contract aged 16 in February 2018 and made his first team debut as a substitute in a 1–3 loss to Paris Saint-Germain on 25 August 2018. 

After making three appearances in the 2018–19 season, he became the team's first choice left-back in the following season until breaking his jaw in a game against Nice in January 2020. At the conclusion of the French league season, which was ended early due to the coronavirus pandemic, he signed a new contract that was due to keep him at Angers until 2023.

Wolverhampton Wanderers
On 4 October 2020, Aït-Nouri moved on a season-long loan deal to Premier League club Wolverhampton Wanderers, with the club having an option of a permanent purchase. Twenty-six days later, he scored his first goal in professional football, on his league debut in a 2–0 home win over Crystal Palace.

On 9 July 2021, Aït-Nouri had made a permanent move to Wolves for £9.8 million, on a five-year deal with an option for a further year. He scored his second goal for Wolves in his 50th appearance for the club, on 15 May 2022, in a 1–1 home Premier League draw with Norwich City.

On 26 December 2022, Aït-Nouri scored the winning Wolves goal in Julen Lopetegui's first Premier League game as Wolves' new head coach away at Everton; this was Aït-Nouri's first league goal of the 2022–23 season.

International career
Born in France, Aït-Nouri is of Algerian descent. He was a youth international for France, having represented the French under-18 and under-21 teams. In January 2023, he switched to represent Algeria internationally.

Career statistics

References

External links
Profile at the Wolverhampton Wanderers F.C. website

2001 births
Living people
Sportspeople from Montreuil, Seine-Saint-Denis
French footballers
France under-21 international footballers
France youth international footballers
French sportspeople of Algerian descent
Association football midfielders
Angers SCO players
Wolverhampton Wanderers F.C. players
Ligue 1 players
Premier League players
Footballers from Seine-Saint-Denis